Crinipus is a genus of moths in the family Sesiidae.

Species
Crinipus leucozonipus  Hampson, 1896
Crinipus marisa (Druce, 1899)
Crinipus pictipes (Hampson, 1919)
Crinipus vassei (Le Cerf, 1917)

References

Sesiidae